Major Farm Meadow is a  biological Site of Special Scientific Interest south-west of Eye in Suffolk.

This is one of the few surviving unimproved hay meadows in the county. It is damp grassland on boulder clay, with diverse flora and many molehills. Flowering plants include cowslip, twayblade and green-winged orchid, and there is a mature specimen of the rare black poplar.

The site is private land with no public access.

References

Sites of Special Scientific Interest in Suffolk